Vsevolod Mikhailovich Bobrov (1 December 1922 – 1 July 1979) was a Soviet athlete, who excelled in football, bandy and ice hockey. He is considered one of the best Soviets ever in each of those sports.

Originally a football player, he played for CDKA Moscow, VVS Moscow, and Spartak Moscow, and represented the Soviet Union internationally at the 1952 Summer Olympics. After he quit football in 1953 he turned to ice hockey, which he had taken up when it was started in the Soviet Union in 1946. He was one of the first ice hockey players in the Soviet Union, and joined CDKA Moscow, playing for them and VVS Moscow before retiring in 1957. A leading scorer in the Soviet League, Bobrov was one of three players to average more than two goals per game over their career, with the other two players (Alexei Guryshev and Viktor Shuvalov) his linemates. Internationally he participated with the Soviet national team at several World Championships, including their first tournament in 1954, as well as the 1956 Winter Olympics, where the Soviets won the gold medal.

After his playing career, Bobrov coached both football and ice hockey. He coached the Soviet national team in ice hockey, most notably during the 1972 Summit Series against Canada. A renowned athlete, he was inducted into the International Ice Hockey Federation Hall of Fame when it was founded in 1997. The Kontinental Hockey League (KHL), a Russian-based league, has one of its four divisions named after Bobrov.

Early life

Bobrov was born in Morshansk on 1 December 1922 and moved to Sestroretsk in 1925, along with his parents and two siblings. He first started to skate at the age of 5, and played bandy from a young age. He left school when he was 13 in order to work in a factory.

Playing career

Football
After serving in the Soviet Army during World War II, he was invited to play football for the Army club CSKA Moscow in 1945. That same year, he joined Dynamo Moscow on their 1945 tour of the United Kingdom; he scored 6 of the 19 their goals, and it was on this tour that he saw artificial ice for the first time. Playing until 1953 for CSKA, VVS, and Spartak, he would go on to win the Soviet Championship three times, scoring 97 goals in only 116 games. Bobrov led the country in goals in 1945 with 24 and 1947 with 14. Chronic knee problems led to him having surgeries in 1947, 1950, 1952, and 1953, to fix the issue, though it never was resolved.

He was capped three times for the Soviet Union national team representing them in the 1952 Summer Olympics. He scored five goals in total, including a hat trick against Yugoslavia, though the Soviets lost that match and failed to medal. He was also part of the CDKA team that was disbanded due to this loss, and transferred to Spartak Moscow for his final season of football.

Ice hockey
Bobrov began playing ice hockey for CSKA a year after his football start, in 1946. However, due to a knee injury sustained during the football season, he missed the first season. His playing career in this sport lasted until 1957, with the years between 1950 and 1953 spent with VVS. Although football was Bobrov's first sport, his success in ice hockey was even greater. In 1947–48, his first season of play, Bobrov scored 52 goals in 18 games. In 1950, a plane crash almost killed the entire VVS Moscow team. Bobrov survived the crash as he overslept and travelled by rail. In the Soviet League, which his teams won seven times, Bobrov scored 254 goals in 130 games; he is one of three players who averaged more than a goal per game in the Soviet Championship (along with Alexei Guryshev and Viktor Shuvalov; the three were linemates). During his career Bobrov was known for his "timing and vision." Anatoli Tarasov said he "controlled the rubber," and later observed that Bobrov was "in slow motion in a way much like [Wayne] Gretzky, which could slow down the whole game and give him seemingly more time to think, to compose the next verse." However he did not focus on defence, and would often stay at centre ice for periods of 10 to 20 seconds.

Internationally Bobrov played for the Soviet national team in the 1956 Winter Olympics, becoming one of the few athletes to participate in both the Summer and Winter Olympics. Bobrov proceeded to lead his country to the gold medal, and also won the World Championship in 1954 and 1956. He won silver in 1955 when his team lost to Canada, represented by the Penticton Vees, and he suffered a career-ending injury. Overall, he scored 89 goals in 59 games for his country. In Russian ice hockey, his name was given to an exclusive list of players, the Bobrov Club, who scored over 250 goals during their career.

Bobrov, who served as a player-coach in both sports during his time with VVS, would go on to coach various teams after retiring as a player in both football and ice hockey. In the latter, he coached the USSR in the 1972 Summit Series and then led them to the World Championship in 1974 and 1975.

Later life and legacy
Bobrov died in Moscow in 1979. He was elected to the International Ice Hockey Federation Hall of Fame in 1997, the first year it was created. For the greatest Russian athlete in the 20th century, Bobrov finished third behind football goalkeeper Lev Yashin and Greco-Roman wrestler Alexander Karelin.

The Kontinental Hockey League, a Russian-based ice hockey league, has one of its four divisions named after Bobrov.

In popular culture 
 The movie My Best Friend, General Vasili, Son of Joseph Stalin (1991) was inspired by the story of his friendship with Vasili Stalin
 Bobrov is mentioned in the movie The Death of Stalin.

References

Bibliography

  
 
 </ref>
Wallechinsky, David and Jaime Loucky (2010). "Ice Hockey: Men". In The Complete Book of the Winter Olympics: 2010 Edition. London: Aurum Press Limited. p. 25.

External links

 
 
  Profile and Statistics at People.ru
  Profile and Statistics at FootballFacts.ru
  Profile and Statistics at Rusteam.Permian.ru
  Biography at Football99.ru
Bobrov at Hockey CCCP International

1922 births
1979 deaths
Association football forwards
Burials at Kuntsevo Cemetery
Expatriate football managers in Kazakhstan
FC Chornomorets Odesa managers
FC Kairat managers
FC Spartak Moscow players
Footballers at the 1952 Summer Olympics
HC CSKA Moscow players
Honoured Masters of Sport of the USSR
Ice hockey players at the 1956 Winter Olympics
IIHF Hall of Fame inductees
Medalists at the 1956 Winter Olympics
Merited Coaches of the Soviet Union
Olympic footballers of the Soviet Union
Olympic gold medalists for the Soviet Union
Olympic ice hockey players of the Soviet Union
Olympic medalists in ice hockey
People from Morshansk
PFC CSKA Moscow managers
PFC CSKA Moscow players
Russian expatriate sportspeople in Kazakhstan
Russian football managers
Russian footballers
Soviet bandy players
Soviet football managers
Soviet footballers
Soviet ice hockey coaches
Soviet ice hockey left wingers
Soviet Top League players
Soviet Union international footballers
Soviet Union national ice hockey team coaches
Sportspeople from Tambov Oblast
Soviet military personnel of World War II